The Pro-Cathedral of the Holy Trinity is an Anglican Pro-Cathedral in Ixelles, a municipality of Brussels, Belgium. It is part of the Diocese in Europe of the Church of England. The church is located at 29, /, near the Avenue Louise/Louizalaan.

Origins
The Pro-Cathedral of the Holy Trinity in Brussels was formed in 1958 by the amalgamation of the congregations of Christ Church and the nearby Church of the Resurrection (now closed). It is a Pro-Cathedral for the Diocese in Europe. The cathedral is in Gibraltar, called the Cathedral of the Holy Trinity (and there is a further Pro-Cathedral in Valletta), but Robert Innes, Bishop in Europe (and former Chancellor (priest-in-charge) of Holy Trinity), is the first Bishop to be based in Brussels.

Current clergy
As of 7 January 2018, the clergy include: Paul Vrolijk, Canon Chancellor and Senior Chaplain (since 2015; also Archdeacon of North West Europe since 2016); Jack McDonald, Canon Theologian and priest-in-charge of Leuven (since 2012); and John Wilkinson, Canon Pastor and Associate Chaplain (since 2015).

List of chancellors
Upon the establishment of Holy Trinity as the Pro-Cathedral in 1980, the Chaplain became the chancellor.

Peter Duplock, 1980-81. Duplock had been Chaplain of Brussels since 1977. He was also Archdeacon of Belgium, Luxembourg and the Netherlands from 1977 to 1980; from 1980 to 1981 he was also Archdeacon of North-West Europe.
John Lewis, 1982-93. Lewis was also Archdeacon of North-West Europe.
Nigel Maynard Walker, 1994-2004.
Robert Innes, 2005-14
Paul Vrolijk, 2015–present. Vrolijk was also Archdeacon of North-West Europe from 2016 to 2020.

Other staff
Anthony Jennings, choirmaster from 1968 through 1972.

See also
 List of churches in Brussels
 St. Boniface Church, Antwerp
 Saint George's Memorial Church, Ypres
 St Paul's Pro-Cathedral, Valletta

References

External links

Ixelles
Churches in Brussels
Anglican church buildings in Belgium
Anglican cathedrals in Europe
Cathedrals in Belgium
Gothic Revival church buildings in Belgium
Diocese in Europe